Santiago González may refer to:

 Santiago González (politician) (1818–1887), President of El Salvador, 1871–1876
 Santiago González Bonorino (born 1975), former Argentine rugby union player
 Santiago González (tennis) (born 1983), Mexican tennis player
 Santiago González Iglesias (born 1988), Argentine rugby union player
 Santiago González (footballer) (born 1992), Uruguayan football player for Montreal Impact